After All It's Only Life is a 1993 Argentine comedy film directed and written by Víctor Dínenzon and written by José Ángel Esteban. The film stars Gerardo Romano. It premiered on 5 August 1993 in Buenos Aires.

Plot summary
Three women ridiculed by their spouses glide to take revenge themselves with the intention to demonstrate to them that they are quite different from what is being portrayed.

Cast
 Gerardo Romano
 Héctor Alterio
 Sandra Ballesteros
 Michèle Duquet
 Rodolfo Ranni
 Rubén Stella
 Cora Sanchez
 Claudia Nicola
 Ernesto Larrese

External links
 

1993 films
1990s Spanish-language films
1993 comedy films
Argentine comedy films
1990s Argentine films